Gban, or Gagu (Gagou), is a Mande language of Ivory Coast. Dialects are N’da, Bokwa, Bokabo, Tuka.

References

Mande languages
Languages of Ivory Coast